Hindoostan was a battle honour awarded to the following regiments of the British Army for their service during the conquest of British India between 1780 and 1823:
8th King's Royal Irish Hussars
17th (Leicestershire) Regiment of Foot, later the Royal Leicestershire Regiment
36th (Herefordshire) Regiment of Foot, later 2nd Battalion, Worcestershire Regiment
52nd (Oxfordshire) Regiment of Foot, later 2nd Battalion, Oxfordshire and Buckinghamshire Light Infantry
71st (Highland) Regiment of Foot, later 1st Battalion, Highland Light Infantry
72nd (Highland) Regiment of Foot, later 1st Battalion, Seaforth Highlanders
76th (Hindoostan) Regiment of Foot, later 2nd Battalion, The Duke of Wellington's Regiment (West Riding)

References

Norman, C.B.: Battle Honours Of The British Army, From Tangier, 1662, To The Commencement Of The Reign Of King Edward VII. John Murray 1911.

Battle honours of the British Army